Manhunt is an American syndicated half-hour television crime drama starring Victor Jory as a San Diego police detective and  Patrick McVey as a police reporter. Seventy-eight episodes were broadcast between April 15, 1959, and 1961.

Filmed on location in San Diego, the series regularly showcased local sites such as the Pacific Highway district, Police Headquarters, the San Diego Zoo, the Star of India (ship), San Diego Bay, the Bali Hai Resort and the Hotel Del Coronado. A panorama of the cityscape was featured during the closing credits.

Recognition 
In 1960 the National Conference of Police Commissioners recognized the program for depicting "an accurate and realistic picture of the modern police officer".

Cast 
Victor Jory as Det. Lieutenant Howard Finucane	
Patrick McVey as Ben Andrews	
Charles Bateman as Det. George Peters (episodes 1-13)	
Rian Garrick as Det. Bruce Hanna (episodes 14-23)	
Chuck Henderson as Det. Dan Kramer (episodes 24-39)	
Michael Stefani as Det. Paul Kirk (episodes 40-52)	
Robert L. Crawford, Sr., as Det. Phil Burns (episodes 53-65)	
Todd Armstrong as Det. Carl Spencer (episodes 66-78)
Producer Robert Sparks said that actors who portrayed rookie policemen on the series were "taking on-the-air auditions" with the role increasing from one week to the next. Sparks said, "Everything from his attitude on the set to the nature of his fan mail is carefully checked."

Episodes

Season 1 (1959–60)

Season 2 (1960–61)

References

External links

1950s American crime drama television series
1960s American crime drama television series
Television series by Sony Pictures Television
First-run syndicated television programs in the United States
1959 American television series debuts
1961 American television series endings
Black-and-white American television shows
Television shows set in San Diego
English-language television shows
Fictional portrayals of the San Diego Police Department